Gunārs Ulmanis (1938 – 17 July 2010) was a Latvian football right wing midfielder, one of the most famous Latvian footballers of the 1960s.

Biography

While at school Ulmanis played both basketball and football but the famous Latvian football coach Vadims Ulbergs persuaded him to devote himself entirely to football.

For his first team in the regional competition Ulmanis scored 60 out of the team's 78 goals and was called up to the flagman of Latvian football - Daugava Rīga. In his first game for Daugava - an international game against Polish GKS Katowice - Ulmanis scored 3 goals.

He was popular among Latvian football fans for his "lazy" and relaxed playing manner which he was able to alter with unexpected outbursts of energy in form of shots on goal or passes to the center. His popularity was partly also connected with his last name Ulmanis (the same as former Latvian president Kārlis Ulmanis) which also brought him troubles with the Soviet authorities.

He played for Daugava for almost his entire career - from 1955 until 1969, scoring many important goals and having been elected the team captain.

After Daugava he spent two years as player-manager for Rīgas radiorūpnīca and since that he has been coaching youth players. He died on 17 July 2010 at the age of 71.

References

1938 births
2010 deaths
Latvian footballers
Daugava Rīga players
Association football forwards
Soviet footballers
Soviet Top League players